Lebyazhe is a village in Kharkiv Oblast (district) in Chuhuiv Raion of eastern Ukraine, about  southeast by east from the centre of Kharkiv city.

The village came under attack by Russian forces in April 2022, during the Russian invasion of Ukraine.

References

Villages in Chuhuiv Raion